Bishop Eugene Joseph Butler, C.S.Sp., was an Irish born Spiritan priest who served as Bishop of Zanzibar (1957–1964) and Bishop of Mombasa (1964–1978).

He was born in Belfast, and educated by the Christian brothers locally at St. Mary's Grammar School, leaving school at 16 he worked as a clerk, before going to Kimmage Manor, to train as a priest. He studied philosophy in St. Marys College, and prefected in Blackrock College studying Theology and was ordained a Holy Ghost Father in 1928. He was sent to East Africa where he taught, holding a number of church positions. In 1957 he was appointed Bishop of Mombasa and Zanzibar, ordained in Belfast. From 1964 the Bishopric became Mombasa.

Bishop Butler resigned in 1978, and retired to Ireland and stayed in the Sacred Heart Residence of the Little Sisters of the Poor at Sybil Hill, Raheny. He died peacefully a few years later 3 May 1981 aged 80 years and was buried in Kimmage in the Spiritan plot, following his funeral there.

References

1900 births
1981 deaths
20th-century Roman Catholic bishops in Tanzania
Roman Catholic missionaries in Kenya
Roman Catholic bishops of Mombasa
Irish expatriate Catholic bishops
20th-century Roman Catholic bishops in Kenya
Holy Ghost Fathers
20th-century Irish Roman Catholic priests
Irish Spiritans
Irish expatriates in Kenya